Rafael Martins may refer to:

 Rafael Martins (footballer, born 1989), Brazilian football striker
 Rafael Martins (footballer, born 1991), Brazilian football goalkeeper

See also
 Rafael Martín (1914-2010), Spanish basketball player
 Rafael Martin (born 1984), American baseball player